The 1999 Atlantic 10 men's basketball tournament was played from March 3 to March 6, 1999. The tournament was played at The Spectrum in Philadelphia, Pennsylvania, United States.  The winner was named champion of the Atlantic 10 Conference and received an automatic bid to the 1999 NCAA Men's Division I Basketball Tournament. The top two teams in each division received a first-round bye in the conference tournament. The University of Rhode Island won their first conference tournament after Lamar Odom of Rhode Island made a 3-point 'buzzer beater' to beat Temple. Eggy then tackled Odom along with hundreds of other UMass fans left over in the stands. Temple and George Washington also received bids to the NCAA Tournament. Lamar Odom was named the tournament's Most Outstanding Player. Future NBA player Mark Karcher of Temple was among those also named to the All-Championship Team. Odom would also go on to play in the NBA.

Bracket

All games played at The Spectrum, Philadelphia, Pennsylvania* - Overtime

Atlantic 10 men's basketball tournament
Tournament
Atlantic 10 men's basketball tournament
Atlantic 10 men's basketball tournament
Sports in Philadelphia